Melancholia was one of the four temperaments in proto-psychology and pre-modern medicine, representing a state of low mood.

Melancholia may also refer to:
 Depression (mood), a state of low mood also known as "melancholia"
 Major depressive disorder, a mood disorder historically called "melancholia"
 Involutional melancholia, a traditional name for a psychiatric disorder affecting mainly elderly or late middle-aged people that is no longer in use

Film and television
 Melancholia, a 1989 British-German film by Andi Engel, starring Jeroen Krabbé
 Melancholia (2008 film), a Philippine film by Lav Diaz
 Melancholia (2011 film), an English-language film by Lars von Trier
 Melancholia (TV series), a 2021 South Korean thriller TV series

Other uses
 "Melancholia", a musical composition by Duke Ellington that first appeared on the album The Duke Plays Ellington
 5708 Melancholia, an asteroid
 Melencolia I, an engraving by Albrecht Dürer
 Melancholy (novel) or Melancholia I, a 1995 novel by Jon Fosse
 Melancholy II or Melancholia II, a 1996 novella by Jon Fosse
 Melancholia (painting), a painting by Lucas Cranach the Elder

See also 
 Melancholy (disambiguation)
 La Malinconia (disambiguation)